A Prayer kettle is a traditional religious worship item of many enslaved African Americans in the United States. Under slavery African Americans were forbidden to read or write, which made organized religious writing and reading the Bible difficult.

To overcome this legal barrier to their practicing of religion, the slaves would use a traditional kettle or cauldron to pray. Prayers for freedom were whispered into the kettles, which were often hidden beneath floorboards of slave cabins to keep them out of sight from their masters.

Slaves would also often use the kettle to hide precious items and shiny metal trinkets carved in the traditional African arts and crafts style. Property ownership was forbidden of slaves and these items would have been taken away if the white masters found them.

Today many descendants of slaves still have the prayer kettles of their ancestors and use them in prayer to keep this traditional and distinctly American form of worship alive for future generations.

The most famous prayer kettle in existence today is owned by Brother William Ford III, a pastor from Texas. It has been in Ford's family for over three centuries and is 350 years old. Ford has taken his kettle on a tour of the entire country to encourage people to learn about the tradition of prayer kettles and reinvigorate people's faith in their power as a symbol of worship and freedom from bondage.

External links
 Article about a Prayer Kettle tour in 2001

Slavery in the United States
African-American cultural history